Emmet Thomas Flood IV is an American attorney who served as the interim White House Counsel to U.S. President Donald Trump from October 17, 2018, to December 10, 2018, following the resignation of Don McGahn. He also served as a Special Counsel during the George W. Bush Administration.

Early life and education 

Flood attended Fenwick High School in Oak Park, Illinois, graduating in 1974.

Flood obtained a Bachelor of Arts from the University of Dallas in 1978. He received a Master of Arts and a Doctor of Philosophy from the University of Texas at Austin in 1981 and 1986, respectively. His doctoral thesis was entitled Philosophy and narrative form. He went on to earn a Juris Doctor from Yale Law School in 1991. 

He was an Andrew W. Mellon Foundation fellow at Wesleyan University from 1987 to 1988, where he delivered a colloquium entitled: "Some Uses of Narrative in the History of Philosophy: Synoptic Judgment and Philosophical Plot".

Career 

Flood was a law clerk for Judge Ralph K. Winter of the United States Court of Appeals for the Second Circuit and for Associate Justice of the Supreme Court of the United States Antonin Scalia.

Flood advised President Bill Clinton during his impeachment process. Flood's law firm also represented Hillary Clinton on matters relating to the Clinton email controversy.

Flood represented Dick Cheney in response to Wilson v. Cheney, a civil lawsuit filed by Valerie Plame for his alleged role in the Plame affair.

Flood advised Virginia Governor Bob McDonnell on his response to the corruption investigation into his activities. Flood was retained by Cameron International to defend them after the Deepwater Horizon oil spill.

In 2017, Flood was offered a job in the Trump Administration, though he declined. In March, 2018, Flood met with President Donald Trump in the Oval Office to discuss the White House's response to the Special Counsel investigation.

On May 2, 2018, it was reported that Flood would be replacing Ty Cobb as the White House attorney dealing with the investigation of President Donald Trump by Special Counsel Robert Mueller.

On October 18, 2018, Flood was appointed Assistant to the President and Counsel to the President, replacing Don McGahn, to temporarily hold the position until the hiring of Pat Cipollone is complete. He demitted office on December 10, 2018.

Private sector
He is a partner at Williams & Connolly. He wrote a response in late April 2019 to Attorney General William Barr concerning the Mueller Report.

Personal 

He served on the Advisory Council of the Catholic Charities Legal Network.

Publications

See also 
 List of law clerks of the Supreme Court of the United States (Seat 9)

References 

20th-century American lawyers
21st-century American lawyers
Law clerks of the Supreme Court of the United States
Lawyers from Washington, D.C.
Lawyers who have represented the United States government
Living people
Place of birth missing (living people)
Texas Republicans
University of Dallas alumni
University of Texas at Austin alumni
Wesleyan University alumni
White House Counsels
Yale Law School alumni
1956 births
Williams & Connolly people